Koso may refer to:

 A native American tribe also known as Timbisha
 Koso (drink), traditional Japanese fermented drink
 Koso (Naga surname), an Angami Naga surname
 Koso (surname)
 KOSO, a radio station (92.9 FM) licensed to Patterson, California